Andreas Larsson (born March 18, 1972) in Stockholm is a Swedish sommelier. In 2007 he was elected World's Best Sommelier.

Biography 
At 16, Larsson joined a catering school and trained to become a chef. Larsson worked as a chef for seven years. In 1996, while traveling in France, he discovered the world of wine in Burgundy and the Rhône valley. Larsson is currently Wine Director at PM & Vänner in Southern Sweden. Larsson is also involved in consulting, tasting and teaching around the globe. Larsson tastes wine for Decanter.

Awards 
 2001, 2002, 2003: Best Sommelier in Sweden 
 2002: Best Sommelier in Scandinavia 
 2004: Best Sommelier in Europe
 2007: World's Best Sommelier

References

External links 
 

Sommeliers
1972 births
Living people